Eirias Stadium, known for sponsorship reasons as Stadiwm CSM, is a multi-purpose stadium that is part of the outdoor complex of the Eirias Events Centre in Eirias Park, Colwyn Bay, Wales. It is home to the Principality Premiership team, RGC 1404 and RFL League 1 team North Wales Crusaders. The stadium had been used for sporting events, until its redevelopment in 2011, where it now can host international televised events.

History
In the early 1950s the Council developed a sports arena and running track on land which had been used for 350 allotments during the Second World War and 80,000 tonnes of soil were removed during construction. Although an athletics event was held in July 1954, it was not until June 1955 that the arena was officially opened by the Lord Lieutenant, Colonel J. C. Wynne Finch. A message from Prince Philip, Duke of Edinburgh was read out and following the official opening, athletes including John Disley took part in the North Wales district championships. Prior to 2011, it had been used for various community sporting and non sporting events and representative matches. In 1987 improvements saw a new synthetic running track, floodlights, terracing and a new all seated grandstand built.

Colwyn Bay F.C. had played on three different grounds at Eirias Park during their history. The Arena was a temporary home for a season and a half during the early 1980s prior to the club's move to their present Llanelian Road home ground. The Seagulls faced Liverpool's reserve side, which included future England international Jamie Carragher, in a pre-season friendly at the Stadium in August 1995 in a game which finished 1-1. The Stadium has hosted Wales youth football internationals over the years, including Wales Under-15 Schoolboys featuring future senior team captain Kevin Ratcliffe beating France 2-0 in front of over 7,000 fans in June 1976 and three years later an Under-15 side featuring Mark Hughes and Mark Bowen lost to West Germany. Wales Under-16s' friendly match against Poland in 2012 featured future Welsh senior internationals Harry Wilson, Daniel James and Joe Morrell

A game between North Wales and a WRU XV was held in April 1956 and on September 28, 1979 North Wales XV faced Romania, in a game which the tourists won 38-15. A year later, as part of the Welsh Rugby Union’s Centenary Year, the  North Wales team faced an Overseas side featuring players from seven different countries in a match which the Overseas team won 28-9.

In 2008 the park had been identified by the Welsh Rugby Union (WRU) as a venue for the newly founded rugby union team RGC 1404. The team was initially planning to join the Welsh Premiership, with an eventual goal of becoming the fifth Welsh rugby region, for domestic and European tournaments. In light of this, the park was in need of a number of improvements to reach international standard and so that it could be officially considered a stadium. In January 2010, the proposed redevelopment was approved by the local council, with work starting later that year.

The new £6.5 million stadium opened in 2011, featuring a 'Grade A' rugby and football pitch which is to international standard, as well as a 'Grade A' Athletics Track. The stadium now has the potential to host events for up to 15,000 spectators. However its common use for football and rugby, means it normally holds up to 6,080 though the 2,580 capacity grand stand and terracing for a further 3,500. The installment of floodlights and team changing facilities, means the stadium has the capability to broaden their events to other sporting activities and night time kick offs.

Colwyn Bay F.C. were linked with a return to Eirias Stadium in 2011 because of Conference ground regulations and then manager Dave Challinor was impressed with the facilities but the club remained at Llanelian Road.

Since the stadiums reopening, they have hosted numerous international events from sport and music. Sporting wise, the stadium is now official home to RGC 1404 and the Wales U20's rugby union team. The International Rugby Board (IRB) has recognized the standard of the stadium, and in 2012 the stadium was host to a number of Test matches featuring Canada, Russia, Samoa, Tonga and the United States. In 2013, the IRB again chose Eirias Stadium as a venue to host an International fixture, with Japan winning 40–13 against Russia.

The opening ceremony of the 2014 Wales Rally GB was held at Eirias Stadium.  Since 2012 all Wales' home under-20s games in the Six Nations. Wales held a training camp at Eirias Stadium ahead of the 2015 Rugby World Cup. A Wales side beat RGC 1404 88–19 in a warm-up game ahead of the 2017 summer tour.

Wales' final game of the 2020 Six Nations Under 20s Championship against Scotland on 13 March 2020 was played behind closed doors due to the COVID-19 outbreak.

In April 2021 rugby league team North Wales Crusaders announced that the stadium would be the club base for the season due to COVID-19 regulations making their home ground in Wrexham unavailable.

Sponsorship
Between 2017 and 2022 the stadium was known as Stadiwm Zip World.

International rugby union matches

Since 2012, it has hosted Wales home matches in the Six Nations Under 20s Championship.

Concerts 

Since 2012, the stadium sees over 15,000 people at the park for the annual Access All Eirias Music Festival. This includes singers like Olly Murs, Pixie Lott, Cover Drive, Little Mix and Welsh performers Tom Jones and Rhydian Roberts.

See also
 List of stadia in Wales by capacity

References

External links
 

Stadiums in Wales
Rugby union stadiums in Wales
Colwyn Bay
Football venues in Wales
Defunct football venues in Wales
Sport in Conwy County Borough